The Chagres Formation (Tc) is a geologic formation in the Colón Province of central Panama. The sandstones and siltstones were deposited in a shallow marine environment and preserve fossils dating back to the Middle to Late Miocene (Tortonian to Messinian, Clarendonian to Hemphillian in the NALMA classification) period.

Description 
The Chagres Formation is exposed in the northern part of the Panama Canal Zone. The formation overlies and partly overlaps the Gatún Formation. Calcareous strata at the base of the formation throughout most of the outcrop area in the Canal Zone constitute the Toro limestone member.

The name Chagres Sandstone was proposed by MacDonald in 1919 for the sandstone forming the hills that overlook the coast from Toro Point to the mouth of the Chagres River. The sandstone is so massive that estimates of thickness are uncertain.

Fossil content 
Various fossils have been found in the Chagres Formation:

Fish 

 Alopias superciliosus
 Benthosema pluridens
 Carcharhinus brachyurus
 Carcharhinus cionei
 Carcharhinus obscurus
 Carcharhinus plumbeus
 Carcharhinus signatus
 Carcharodon plicatilis
 Centrophorus granulosus
 Cynoscion prolixus
 Dalatias licha
 Diaphus barrigonensis, D. rodriguezi
 Galeocerdo cuvier
 Galeorhinus galeus
 Hemipristis serra
 Heptranchias perlo
 Heterodontus sp.
 Isistius sp.
 Lampadena scapha
 Lepidophanes inflectus
 Megalodon
 Mustelus sp.
 Myctophum arcanum, M. degraciai
 Myliobatis sp.
 Premontreia sp.
 Pristiophorus sp.
 Pseudocarcharias kamoharai
 Rhizoprionodon sp.
 Sphyrna lewini
 Squalus sp.
 Squatina sp.
 Trigonognathus sp.

Mammals 
 Isthminia panamensis
 Nanokogia isthmia

Invertebrates 
 Fusiturricula fenimorei

See also 

 List of fossiliferous stratigraphic units in Panama

References

Bibliography 
 
 A. J. W. Hendy, D. P. Buick, K. V. Bulinski, C. A. Ferguson, and A. I. Miller. 2008. Unpublished census data from Atlantic coastal plain and circum-Caribbean Neogene assemblages and taxonomic opinions
 
 
 
 
 

Geologic formations of Panama
Neogene Panama
Messinian
Tortonian
Clarendonian
Hemphillian
Sandstone formations
Siltstone formations
Shallow marine deposits
Paleontology in Panama
Formations
Formations